Mokhvor (also Romanized as Mokhowr and Makhowr; also known as Mākhūrlu) is a village in Howmeh Rural District, in the Central District of Bijar County, Kurdistan Province, Iran. At the 2006 census, its population was 13, in 4 families. The village is populated by Kurds.

References 

Towns and villages in Bijar County
Kurdish settlements in Kurdistan Province